SBL may refer to:

 Society of Biblical Literature
 Spamhaus Block List of spamming IP addresses 
 Stadium Builder License (personal seat license), to buy season tickets
 Super Bowl L, officially known as Super Bowl 50
 Supreme Beings of Leisure, an electronic/lounge band

Sports leagues 
 Slovak Basketball League
 Southland Bowling League, US women's college conference
 State Basketball League, former name of the west conference of NBL1 in Western Australia
 Super Basketball League, Taiwan
 Swiss Basketball League